Zhang Ouying (2 November 1975 – 1 December 2018) was a Chinese football (soccer) player who competed in the 2000 Summer Olympics and in the 2004 Summer Olympics as well as the 1999, 2003, and 2007 FIFA Women's World Cup. She was a member of the Chinese team that won the silver medal at the 1999 World Cup.

Life 
Zhang was born in Zhangjiakou, Hebei in 1975. In 2000, she finished fifth with the Chinese team in the 2000 Summer Olympics. She played all three matches. Four years later she finished ninth with the Chinese team in the 2004 Summer Olympics. She played in one match.

She married an American in 2006, and moved to the United States after retirement.

From 2010 to 2012, she coached numerous teams at the San Diego Futbol Academy in Rancho Peñasquitos, California. After that, she coached teams for the San Diego Soccer Club and was often referred to as "Coach O".

Zhang was diagnosed with lung cancer in March 2018, and died in San Diego on 1 December 2018, at the age of 43.

References

External links
Profile
Profile at Women's United Soccer Association

1975 births
2018 deaths
1999 FIFA Women's World Cup players
2003 FIFA Women's World Cup players
2007 FIFA Women's World Cup players
Asian Games gold medalists for China
Asian Games medalists in football
Women's association football forwards
China women's international footballers
Chinese emigrants to the United States
Chinese expatriate sportspeople in the United States
Footballers at the 1998 Asian Games
Footballers at the 2000 Summer Olympics
Footballers at the 2004 Summer Olympics
Footballers from Hebei
Olympic footballers of China
Sportspeople from Zhangjiakou
San Diego Spirit players
Women's United Soccer Association players
Expatriate women's soccer players in the United States
Chinese women's footballers
Medalists at the 1998 Asian Games
Deaths from lung cancer in California